Shardul Gagare (born 2 September 1997 in Sangamner) is an Indian chess player. He received the FIDE title of Grandmaster (GM) in 2016 and became the 42nd Grandmaster from India. Shardul is brother to Indian WIM Shalmali Gagare.

References

External links 
 

1997 births
Living people
Indian chess players
Chess grandmasters